The following is a list of mayors of the city of Teresina, in Piauí state, Brazil.

 , 1880-1887 
 , 1887-1893 
 Manoel Raimundo da Paz, 1893-1897
 Antônio Gonçalves Pedreira Portelada, 1897-1901
 Benjamim de Sousa Martins, 1901-1905
 Afonso Ribeiro de Albuquerque, 1905
 Domingos Monteiro, 1905-1909
 Emílio César Burlamaqui, 1909
 Adão de Medeiros Soares, 1909, 1910
 , 1909-1910
 Tersandro Gentil Pedreira Paz, 1910-1917
 Antônio da Costa Araújo, 1917-1921
 Manoel Raimundo da Paz Filho, 1921-1924
 João da Cruz Monteiro, 1924-1925
 Anfrísio Lobão Veras Filho, 1925-1929
 Domingos Monteiro, 1929-1930
 , 1930
 João Martins do Rego, 1930-1931
 Domingos Monteiro, 1931-1932
 , 1932
 Luís Pires Chaves, 1932-1935
 , 1935
 Francisco do Rego Monteiro, 1935-1936
 Lindolfo do Rego Monteiro, 1936-1945
 José Martins Leite Pereira, 1945-1946
 Celso Pinheiro Filho, 1946
 Durvalino Couto, 1947
 Godofredo Freire da Silva, 1947-1948
 José Virgílio Castelo Branco da Rocha, 1948
 José Martins Leite Pereira, 1948
 José Ribamar de Castro Lima, 1948-1951
 , 1951-1955
 Agenor Barbosa de Almeida, 1955-1959
 , 1959-1963
 Hugo Bastos, 1963-1967
 , 1967-1969
 Raimundo Bona Medeiros, 1969-1970, 1979-1982
 Wagner Saraiva de Lima, 1970
 Haroldo Borges, 1970-1971
 , 1971-1975
 , 1975-1979, 1986-1988, 1993-1995 
 , 1982-1983
 , 1983-1986 
 , 1989-1992 
 Francisco Gerardo, 1995-1996
 Firmino Soares Filho, 1997-2004, 2013- 
 , 2005-2010 
 Elmano Férrer, 2010-2012

See also
 Elections in Teresina (in Portuguese)
 List of mayors of largest cities in Brazil (in Portuguese)
 List of mayors of capitals of Brazil (in Portuguese)

References

This article incorporates information from the Portuguese Wikipedia.

Mayors of places in Brazil
People from Teresina
Piauí politicians
teresina